The 43rd Walker Cup Match was played on 10 and 11 September 2011 at the Royal Aberdeen Golf Club in Aberdeen, Scotland, United Kingdom. Team Great Britain and Ireland won 14 to 12.

Format
On Saturday, there are four matches of foursomes in the morning and eight singles matches in the afternoon. On Sunday, there are again four matches of foursomes in the morning, followed by ten singles matches (involving every player) in the afternoon. In all, 26 matches are played.

Each of the 26 matches is worth one point in the larger team competition. If a match is all square after the 18th hole extra holes are not played. Rather, each side earns ½ a point toward their team total. The team that accumulates at least 13½ points wins the competition. In the event of a tie, the previous winner retains the Cup.

Course
The matches were played on the Balgownie Links of the Royal Aberdeen Golf Club in Aberdeen, Scotland, which is a par 71 course. The club was founded in 1780, and is the sixth-oldest golf club in the world. The club moved to the Balgownie Links in 1888, and has hosted a number of Scottish tournaments (including the Boys Amateur Championship) and the 2005 Senior British Open Championship. The club has one other course, named the Silverburn.

Teams
Ten players for the US and Great Britain & Ireland participated in the event plus one non-playing captain for each team.

Note: World Amateur Golf Ranking as of 4 September 2011.

Saturday's matches

Morning foursomes

Afternoon singles

Sunday's matches

Morning foursomes

Afternoon singles

References

External links
Official site
Royal Aberdeen Golf Club

Walker Cup
Golf tournaments in Scotland
Sports competitions in Aberdeen
Walker Cup
Walker Cup
Walker Cup
21st century in Aberdeen